Toka Tū Ake EQC, also known as the Earthquake Commission,, is a New Zealand Crown entity that invests in natural disaster research and education as well as providing natural disaster insurance to residential property owners. In March 2022, a bill was introduced to, among other changes, update the name of the Earthquake Commission to Toka Tū Ake – Natural Hazards Commission.

It was established in its current form by the Earthquake Commission Act 1993, which was a continuation of the Earthquake and War Damage Commission, set up in 1945. It operates under the provisions of that EQC Act and of other relevant law, such as the Crown Entities Act 2004.

Function of Toka Tū Ake EQC

The function of Toka Tū Ake EQC is defined in s5 of the EQC Act 1993. In short, this is to provide natural disaster insurance for residential property (contents, dwellings and land); to administer the Natural Disaster Fund; and to fund research and education on natural disasters and ways of reducing their impact.

Premiums are collected for Toka Tū Ake EQC through a compulsory levy added to all home insurance policies. The private insurers transfer the levy to the Natural Disaster Fund (NDF) for use when needed. Money in the NDF can be invested elsewhere to maximise return.

Toka Tū Ake EQC is administered by a Board of Commissioners, whose role is defined by the EQC Act 1993 and the Crown Entities Act 2004. The board answers to the minister responsible who appoints board members. As of June 2021, Toka Tū Ake EQC had 310 permanent and fixed term staff.

Claims settlement

This is determined by the EQC Act 1993 and by legal precedents created over time. Settlement money comes first from the Natural Disaster Fund, then from any re-insurers, and finally from the government, under a Crown guarantee. EQCover insures the policyholders building, personal property, and land.

Each claim is subject to an excess payable by the claimant and a capped maximum sum payable by Toka Tū Ake EQC, known as 'the cap'. As of 2018, the excess and cap for a building claim were 1% and $100,000; for personal property they were 1% and $20,000; and for land they were 10% and a variable cap sum determined by a formula that includes current market land prices. Tax, known as GST, is added to the cap payable. These cap amounts are subject to change but in 2018 they remained the same as they were in 1993. In 1993, $100,000 was enough to cover the cost of rebuilding most houses: in 2018, building costs had increased more than fourfold. In most cases, private home insurance policies cover the cost of natural disaster damage above the amount paid by EQC.

History
Following several destructive earthquakes between 1929 and 1942, the government decided to set up a statutory scheme of disaster insurance, resulting in the Earthquake & War Damage Act 1945. The act provided for the establishment of an Earthquake & War Damage Fund and the scheme was financed by a compulsory levy imposed on all fire insurance policies. Responsibility for collecting the levies was placed on the insurance companies. The act was administered by the State Insurance Office, which provided staff and accounting services; Treasury determined the fund's investment policy. The levy was set at 5 cents per $100 of value and cover was limited to indemnity value. Over time, cover was extended to other natural disasters and to cover damage to land as well as to buildings. The need to cover land damage was identified in a report that followed the 1979 Abbotsford landslip in Dunedin when 69 homes were lost.

The EQC Act brought together the earlier additions and introduced new changes to the system. The insurance was known as EQCover. It was now limited to residential buildings; cover for buildings was confirmed as being for replacement (new), not indemnity, value; and war damage cover was removed. These changes reduced the government's exposure to a very large potential liability and brought the EQC system more in line with current insurance industry practices.

In its first 65 years, the commission was called on to settle only relatively minor claims and the disaster fund continued to grow, reaching $6.1 billion by August 2010. The most notable natural disaster during this period was the 1979 Abbotsford landslip, near Dunedin, that caused the destruction of 69 houses. A subsequent commission of enquiry led, in 1984, to land damage being covered. Another noteworthy event was the 2007 Gisborne earthquake after which the EQC received over 3,100 claims and paid out over $16 million.

Natural Hazards Insurance Bill (2022)

A bill proposing to update the legislation governing the Earthquake Commission was introduced into Parliament in March 2022. The overarching objectives of its changes are "to enable better community recovery from natural hazards, to clarify the role of the Commission and the cover provided by the Bill, and to enhance the durability and flexibility of the legislation.". The Commission's name will change to Toka Tū Ake Natural Hazards Commission.

The Canterbury earthquake sequence
On 4 September 2010, a powerful earthquake struck near Darfield in Canterbury. It began a series of earthquakes and aftershocks lasting till around 2016. The most destructive of these was the 22 February 2011 earthquake, centered close to Christchurch, in which 185 people died. EQC received over 470,000 claims, more than 15,000 families lost their homes, and repair costs were estimated at over $40 billion. EQC acknowledged several times during this period that the scale of the disaster was unprecedented. Speculation at the time about the scale of the damage proved to be significantly incorrect.

In August 2016, the Insurance Council of New Zealand (ICNZ) stated that they were still being handed earthquake claims from EQC from the Christchurch earthquakes, and were thus not able to give a final cost to the insurance industry. In July 2016, EQC had 250 complex cases from Christchurch unresolved, 364 first-time repairs yet to be finished, and 6,144-second-time repairs being handled. If the damage stays "under cap" (i.e. it is up to $100,000 plus GST), EQC assessors dealt with the claim. When the claim goes "over cap", the settlement process is handed to the commercial insurer. This situation led to much double-handling and many inefficiencies, and has been widely criticised. In 2015, the Insurance Council of New Zealand submitted to the government that the process be changed and all assessments be handled by commercial insurers instead. Following the 2016 Kaikoura earthquake, the government agreed to this proposal in December 2016. It was also stated that "under cap" claims in Christchurch that have still to be settled will remain with EQC.

There is a $1.5 billion NZD excess for each earthquake event. If the required EQC payout exceeds the total of the excess and reinsurance ($4 billion NZD) the remainder of the payout is met by the EQC up to the limit of the Natural Disaster Fund. If the payout exceeds those assets, a Crown Guarantee requires that the Government pay the remainder.

EQC's handling of the earthquake claims
EQC's preferred method of settling claims till this point had been to make payment rather than to repair the damage. However, soon after the 4 September 2010 earthquake, EQC's then chairman, Michael Wintringham, confirmed in the commission's 2010–11 Annual Report that it had been asked by the government to settle claims by repairing buildings, (if the cost was not above cap, in which case EQC would cash settle and pass the claim to the owner's private insurance company).

This preference to repair was both to prevent the predicted upward spiral in building costs if repair money flooded the market, and to reduce the inevitable stress on home owners having to manage their own repairs. The then Chief Executive, Ian Simpson, prefaced these comments by stating: "It is important that we are accurate with our claims settlement process. Not just for our customers in a very difficult and uncertain time but also for the continued confidence of the global insurance market and the protection of the EQC funds for all New Zealanders". The protection of the Disaster Fund is a core responsibility of the Commission. EQC's later response was to engage Fletcher Building, the country's largest construction company, as its agent to undertake the necessary repair work. The result was The Canterbury Home Repair Programme. In doing this, EQC indemnified Fletcher Building against any future liability. In June 2013, the Auditor-General reported on EQC's performance in managing the Canterbury Home Repair Programme. She found it had been "mixed".

For building claims, EQC chose first to assess properties to determine the extent and cost of repairing any damage. This was usually carried out by a two person team comprising an assessor and an estimator. Assessors had no specific qualification other than to be seen as persons of good character with the ability to spot any unjustified or fraudulent claims. Retired police officers were often used. Estimators had building industry experience.

During this period, EQC pointed out the magnitude of the task it faced, its relative success, and the external factors that hindered it from providing an even better service. In 2013, commenting on a report it had commissioned, EQC said: "(the) earthquakes involved the kind of damage you would expect in wartime". It continued: "much has been achieved by EQC throughout the process of responding to Canterbury events as assessments have been completed, contents claims settled, emergency work undertaken and managed repairs underway in Christchurch".

Aside from settling claims, the commission had to deal with many litigation issues.

In 2011, the High Court decided to establish an Earthquake List to handle the expected large number of earthquake related cases. By February 2018, 1,048 claims had been filed, many of them involving EQC.

In March 2013, EQC was criticised after an employee accidentally sent a file containing details on more than 80,000 claims to a contractor. EQC obtained a High Court injunction preventing publication, which a disgruntled ex-employee and blogger breached by publishing an online link to the list. The blogger was found to be in contempt and fined.

In 2015, an earlier finding of "incompetence" against an engineer working for EQC was dismissed by the Chartered Professional Engineers Council (CPEC).

In 2015, a group of around 100 home owners launched proceedings against the EQC for not settling claims according to the standard required by the EQC Act. In April 2016, both parties agreed in a public statement that EQC's standard did comply with the act. The group then discontinued its claim. Both sides claimed success. The High Court awarded costs against the group.

Results of EQC's claim handling

Throughout the process, EQC praised itself and its staff. This was echoed by the unwavering support given by the minister responsible, Gerry Brownlee.

This support was contrasted by countless reports of EQC mismanagement at every level.

In October 2017, a new government was sworn in and the minister responsible changed. In February 2018, Megan Woods, the new minister, expressed her frustration with the EQC board and the pace of claims settlement. After seven years there were more than 2,600 claims still unresolved. She said she would appoint an independent ministerial advisor to work with the board and management who would report directly to her. The minister said: "I've made it clear I am not satisfied with where EQC is in respect of the Canterbury earthquake work seven years on from the 22 February event".

In response Maarten Wevers, the chairman and a lifelong public servant, resigned. He stated: "It is clear that the minister has no confidence in the board and staff of the commission. As chair, I take responsibility for that, and have stepped aside so that the minister can appoint someone whom she assesses will be able to do a better job." A few days later, the minister announced the appointment of Annette King as an interim chairperson, and said: "I'm keen to see a broadening of skills to include people who have been at the coalface and understand the reality faced by those people at the coalface".

An editorial in the Otago Daily Times, on the same day, summed up opinions expressed elsewhere. It read:

It beggars belief that more than seven years on from the most damaging event – Christchurch's deadly 22 February magnitude-6.3 quake – there are still residents waiting for their claims to be completed. It is a disgraceful state of affairs, particularly when EQC was established to provide a rapid, comprehensive recovery from disaster. These quakes were its first really big test – and it failed. There are still more than 2600 claims outstanding out of more than 470,000".

List of ministers
The following ministers have held responsibility for the commission.
Key

See also
Earthquake insurance

References

External links

 
 Earthquake Commission Act 1993
Natural Hazards Insurance Bill

Government agencies established in 1945
New Zealand Crown agents
Earthquakes in New Zealand
1945 establishments in New Zealand